Skin Tight (April 1974) is the fifth studio album by the Ohio Players and the first album released through the Mercury label. It is considered to be their commercial breakthrough.

History
Skin Tight signified a turning point in the group's career towards a more jazzy and polished funk sound. The album began the Players' dominant platinum-selling period, and would bring them a much bigger audience. In fact, this release would outsell all of their previous LPs combined. The band produced and recorded the album in Chicago, with Barry Mraz as recording engineer. The final mix was mastered by Lee Hulko.

It is the second of five Ohio Players albums announced also as a quadraphonic (4-channel stereo) release, the first of four for Mercury.  However, it was never actually released as no known copies have surfaced even among collectors.  According to Billboard, Skin Tight took the top position on the Black Albums chart for six weeks, and missed the Top 10 on the Pop Albums chart by one position.

Covers
R.E.M. performed "Skin Tight" on their Green tour in 1989. A live recording from Orlando, Florida on 30 April 1989 was released as a B-side to "Stand". "Heaven Must Be Like This" was covered by Paul Jackson Jr. featuring Glenn Jones on his 1993 album A River in the Desert. D'Angelo also covered the song on the soundtrack of the 1998 motion picture Down in the Delta.

Track listing

Personnel
Marshall "Rock" Jones – Fender bass
James "Diamond" Williams – drums, chimes, percussion, lead & background vocals
Billy Beck – piano, organ, Fender Rhodes piano, Clavinet, ARP, percussion, lead & background vocals
Leroy "Sugarfoot" Bonner – guitar, percussion, lead & background vocals
Ralph "Pee Wee" Middlebrooks – trumpet, trombone & background vocals
Clarence "Satch" Satchell – baritone saxophone, tenor saxophone, flute, percussion, lead & background vocals
Marvin "Merv" Pierce – trumpet, flugelhorn, valve trombone & background vocals

Charts

Singles

See also
List of number-one R&B albums of 1974 (U.S.)

References

External links
 Skin Tight at Discogs

1974 albums
Ohio Players albums
Mercury Records albums